Ebenezer Atherton Hunt (January 26, 1826 - March 17, 1891) was an American politician from Weymouth, Massachusetts, who served in the Massachusetts House of Representatives, after being elected to the 94th Massachusetts General Court in 1872. He represented the eighth district of Norfolk County, Massachusetts. He was elected to the Massachusetts Senate for two terms, representing Norfolk and Plymouth counties, serving in the 96th Massachusetts General Court, and the 97th Massachusetts General Court.

Personal
Hunt was born in Weymouth, Massachusetts who became a shoe manufacturer, prior to entering politics at a state level.

His father, Atherton Nash Hunt (1802 –1865) was the son of Captain Ebenezer Hunt. His mother was Susannah C. Hobart (1803–1886), from Quincy, Massachusetts.

Hunt married Louisa Ann Follett (1834-1900), from Quincy, Massachusetts, the daughter of George Follett and Betsey Hobart on November 23, 1851.

Hunt died on March 17, 1891, and was buried in the village cemetery in Weymouth, Massachusetts. Now known as the  Front Street Historic District.

See also
1873 Massachusetts legislature
1875 Massachusetts legislature
1876 Massachusetts legislature

References

1826 births
1891 deaths
People from Boston
People from Weymouth, Massachusetts
Members of the Massachusetts House of Representatives
Massachusetts state senators